Karol Pavelka (born 31 July 1983) is a Slovak football striker who currently plays for FC Slovan Galanta.

References

External links 

FC ViOn Zlaté Moravce profile 

1983 births
Living people
Slovak footballers
Association football forwards
FC ViOn Zlaté Moravce players
FC Spartak Trnava players
MFK Karviná players
ŠK Senec players
Slovak Super Liga players
Expatriate footballers in the Czech Republic
People from Partizánske
Sportspeople from the Trenčín Region
FC Slovan Galanta players